Alburnoides fangfangae is a species of small (7.3 cm max length) freshwater fish in the family Cyprinidae. It is endemic to the Osum River in Albania. The specific name honours the Swedish-Chinese ichthyologist Fang Fang Kullander.

References 

Endemic fauna of Albania
Alburnoides
Fish described in 2010